A Standesamt (German, plural "Standesämter") is a German civil registration office, which is responsible for recording births, marriages, and deaths.

Soon after the German Empire was created in 1871 from the previous collection of German states (kingdoms, duchies, etc.), a universal system of register offices was established, taking effect on January 1, 1876. The system had previously been introduced in Prussia on October 1, 1874, and had been in use since the beginning of the 19th century in areas where the French Civil Code applied. Usually, the office was located in the local city or town hall.

Today, those register offices (Standesämter) are still part of the administration of every German municipality (in small communities, they are often incorporated with other offices of the administration). Since 1876, Germans in Germany can only enter into a legal marriage in a Standesamt. Therefore, every German marriage takes place before the local registrar (called Standesbeamter). A religious ceremony can be organised afterwards, but has no legal effect. Apart from that, every child born in Germany has to be registered at a register office (normally by its parents) and every death has to be registered, also. Same sex life partnerships were also registered at Standesamts from 2001, until the legalisation of same-sex marriage in Germany in 2017.

People who are born in Germany can get a copy of their birth certificates in the Standesamt office.

The term "Standesamt" is also used for Austrian register offices, whereas in Switzerland the German word for register office is "Zivilstandsamt".

Government of Germany